The Belgrader Nachrichten, was the official occupation periodical of the Austro-Hungarian Military Governorate in Serbia during the First World War. As the main propaganda organ, the focus of the newspaper was to portray the occupation and its government as benevolent and working in the interest of the Serb population. It was published daily, in German, Serbo-Croatian and Hungarian from 1915 to 1918, during the occupation of Serbia.

History
In 1916, the new Austro-Hungarian military governor of Serbia instituted a system of military law that allowed only one newspaper, the Army's Belgrader Nachrichten, to be printed. During the occupation the use of Serbian Cyrillic script was forbidden in public life, Serbian language was re-cast as “Serbo-Croatian”. Printed materials for the population of Serbia were exclusively in Latin script, Ijekavian dialect with Croatian lexis.

The Belgrader Nachrichten was distributed in Austro-Hungarian occupied territories in German, Hungarian and Serbo-Croatian.

Notable contributors
German Commissioner Wilhelm Ucher was responsible for the editorial board, followed by Croatian Jurica Oršić Slavetićki; for the last two years, Croatian writer  was the editor in chief.

The only Serbian associate writer was Borisav Stanković who took the position after his release from an internment camp at the invitation of Ogrizović and wrote literary feuilletons from December 1916 to March 1918. Austrian writer Otto Alscher wrote a literary column and co-edited the occupation newspaper anonymously.

Note

References

External links
 Library of Congress Online Catalog

Defunct newspapers published in Serbia
Austro-Hungarian occupation of Serbia during World War I
1915 establishments in Serbia
1918 disestablishments in Serbia
Publications established in 1915
Publications disestablished in 1918